CBZ Holdings, whose full name is CBZ Holdings Limited, is a financial services conglomerate in Zimbabwe. It owns subsidiaries in banking, insurance, investments, wealth management, mortgages and retail finance.

Location
The headquarters  of the financial services conglomerate are located on the 3rd Floor of Union House, at 60 Kwame Nkrumah Avenue, in downtown Harare, the capital and largest city in Zimbabwe. The geographical coordinates of the bank's headquarters are: 17°49'40.0"S, 31°02'55.0"E (Latitude:-17.827778; Longitude:31.048611).

Overview
, CBZ Holdings Limited is a large financial services conglomerate in Zimbabwe, with an asset base in excess of US$2.192 billion, and shareholders' equity in excess of US$309.69 million.

History
The flagship business of the Group, CBZ Bank Limited, was founded in 1980. It was taken over by the Government of Zimbabwe in 1991, to avert looming liquidation and was renamed Commercial Bank of Zimbabwe Limited. The company was listed on the Zimbabwe Stock Exchange in 1998. In 2005, the company rebranded, creating CBZ Bank as the main business and CBZ Holdings Limited as the holding company. The member businesses of the Group are as illustrated in the table below, as at 31 December 2017.

Ownership
CBZ Holdings Limited is a publicly traded company. Its stock is listed on the Zimbabwe Stock Exchange, where it trades under the symbol: CBZ. According to the December 2017 Annual Report of the CBZ Holdings Limited (CBZ Group), the major shareholders in the Group were as listed in the table below:

{| style="font-size:100%;"
|-
| width="100%" align="center" | Shareholding in CBZ Holdings Limited
|- valign="top" 
|

See also
CBZ Bank Limited
Economy of Zimbabwe
Reserve Bank of Zimbabwe
Zimbabwe Stock Exchange

References

External links
Website of CBZ Holdings Limited
Listed Companies At Zimbabwe Stock Exchange

Financial services companies of Zimbabwe
Financial services companies established in 1980
Companies listed on the Zimbabwe Stock Exchange
Companies based in Harare
1980 establishments in Zimbabwe